The 2002–03 Idaho Vandals men's basketball team represented the University of Idaho during the 2002–03 NCAA Division I men's basketball season. Members of the Big West Conference, the Vandals were led by second-year head coach Leonard Perry and played their home games on campus at Cowan Spectrum in Moscow, Idaho.

They met fourth seed Cal Poly in the first round of the conference tournament in Anaheim; although Idaho swept the regular season series, they lost to the Mustangs by

Postseason result

|-
!colspan=6 style=| Big West tournament

References

External links
Sports Reference – Idaho Vandals: 2002–03 basketball season
Gem of the Mountains: 2003 University of Idaho yearbook – 2002–03 basketball season
Idaho Argonaut – student newspaper – 2003 editions

Idaho Vandals men's basketball seasons
Idaho
Idaho Vandals men's basketball team
Idaho Vandals men's basketball team